The 1967 Boston Patriots season was the franchise's 8th season in the American Football League. The Patriots recorded three wins, ten losses, and one tie, and finished last in the AFL's Eastern Division.

Notably, the Patriots would not record another tie prior to the introduction of overtime in professional football in 1974, and have not yet recorded a tie (as of ) in the overtime era, which is currently the longest such span among current National Football League teams.

Staff

Roster

Game-by-game results

Notes:
 (*) Played at San Diego Stadium because of the World Series at Fenway Park.
 (**) Played at Alumni Stadium because of the World Series at Fenway Park.

Game summaries

Week 1

Week 2

Week 3

Week 4

Standings

References

Boston Patriots
New England Patriots seasons
Boston Patriots
1960s in Boston